Michelson may refer to:

 Michelson (surname), people with the given name or surname
 27758 Michelson discovered in 1991
 Michelson (crater) on the moon
 Michelson-Gale-Pearson experiment, science
 Michelson interferometer, most common configuration for optical interferometry 
 Michelson–Morley experiment, a scientific experiment regarding the luminiferous ether.
 Michelson Museum of Art, Texas, USA
 Mount Michelson (Brooks Range), Alaska, USA
 USNS Michelson T-AGS-23, United States Naval ship
 Michelson, the domain-specific language for smart contracts in Tezos 
 Michelson, Michigan, an unincorporated community

See also
 Mickelson
 Michaelson